Bosnia and Herzegovina participated in the Eurovision Song Contest 2005 with the song "Call Me" written by Andrej Babić. The song was performed by the group Feminnem. The Bosnian broadcaster Radio and Television of Bosnia and Herzegovina (BHRT) organised the national final BH Eurosong 2005 in order to select the Bosnian entry for the 2005 contest in Kyiv, Ukraine. Fourteen entries participated during the show on 6 March 2005 where a combination of jury and public televoting selected "Zovi" performed by Feminnem as the winner. The song was later translated from Croatian to English for the Eurovision Song Contest and was titled "Call Me".

As one of the ten highest placed finishers in 2004, Bosnia and Herzegovina automatically qualified to compete in the final of the Eurovision Song Contest. Performing during the show in position 21, Bosnia and Herzegovina placed fourteenth out of the 24 participating countries with 79 points.

Background

The nation's best placing in the contest was seventh, which it achieved in 1999 with the song "Putnici" performed by Dino and Béatrice.

The Bosnian national broadcaster, Radio and Television of Bosnia and Herzegovina (BHRT), broadcasts the event within Bosnia and Herzegovina and organises the selection process for the nation's entry. BHRT confirmed their intentions to participate at the 2005 Eurovision Song Contest on 10 December 2004. In , the broadcaster had selected the Bosnian artist through an internal selection process, while a national final was set up to choose the song.

Before Eurovision

BH Eurosong 2005 
BH Eurosong 2005 was the tenth edition of BH Eurosong, the Bosnian national final which selected Bosnia and Herzegovina's entry for the Eurovision Song Contest 2005. The competition was held on 6 March 2005 at the BHRT studios in Sarajevo and hosted by 2002 Bosnian Eurovision entrant Maja Tatić, 2004 Bosnian Eurovision entrant Deen, and 1981 Yugoslav Eurovision entrant Seid Memić Vajta. The show was broadcast on BHT 1 and BH Radio 1.

Competing entries 
On 10 December 2004, the broadcaster opened the submission period for composers to submit their songs up until 17 January 2005. 87 submissions were received at the closing of the deadline and on 19 January 2005, BHRT announced the fifteen songs selected to compete in the national final. The ten-member selection committee that determined the competing songs from the received submissions consisted of Nataša Bogdanović (music producer at Radio RS), Kristijan Čarapina (director of Melodije Mostara), Ferida Duraković (poet), Milorad Kenjalović (Dean of Academy of Arts at the University of Banja Luka), Samir Pašalić (music editor at FTV), Antonio Šajin (Executive Director of Radio Dobre vibracije), Nurudin Vatrenjak (music producer), and members of the Bosnian Delegation for the Eurovision Song Contest: Dejan Kukrić, Ninoslav Verber and Vesna Andree-Zaimović. The competing artists, determined by BHRT in consultation with the selected songwriters, were announced on 15 February 2005 and included 2003 Bosnian Eurovision entrant Mija Martina. The song "C'mon Boy", written by Aleksandra Kovač, was later withdrawn from the competition due to unsuccessful agreements with performer Selma Bajrami.

Final 
The final took place on 6 March 2005. Fourteen entries participated and the 50/50 combination of votes from a jury panel and public televoting selected "Zovi" performed by Feminnem as the winner. Tinka Milinović and Feminnem were tied at 20 points each but since Feminnem received the most votes from the jury they were declared the winners. In addition to the performances of the competing entries, the show featured a guest performance by the show host Seid Memić Vajta.

Preparation 
Following the Bosnian national final, Feminnem prepared Croatian, Danish, English, German, Spanish and Turkish language versions of the song. BHRT announced on 18 March 2005 that they have decided that the song would be performed in English at the Eurovision Song Contest and titled "Call Me".

At Eurovision
According to Eurovision rules, all nations with the exceptions of the host country, the "Big Four" (France, Germany, Spain and the United Kingdom), and the ten highest placed finishers in the 2004 contest are required to qualify from the semi-final on 19 May 2005 in order to compete for the final on 21 May 2005; the top ten countries from the semi-final progress to the final. As Bosnia and Herzegovina finished ninth in the 2004 contest, the nation automatically qualified to compete in the final on 21 May 2005. On 22 March 2005, a special allocation draw was held which determined the running order for the semi-final and final, and Bosnia and Herzegovina was set to perform in position 21 in the final, following the entry from Russia and before the entry from Switzerland. Bosnia and Herzegovina placed fourteenth in the final, scoring 79 points.

The semi-final and the final were broadcast in Bosnia and Herzegovina on BHT 1 with commentary by Dejan Kukrić. The Bosnian spokesperson, who announced the Bosnian votes during the final, was Ana Mirjana Račanović.

Voting 
Below is a breakdown of points awarded to Bosnia and Herzegovina and awarded by Bosnia and Herzegovina in the semi-final and grand final of the contest. The nation awarded its 12 points to Croatia in the semi-final and the final of the contest.

Points awarded to Bosnia and Herzegovina

Points awarded by Bosnia and Herzegovina

References

2005
Countries in the Eurovision Song Contest 2005
Eurovision